M. Kumaran Son of Mahalakshmi is a 2004 Indian Tamil-language sports dramedy film directed by M. Raja, starring Jayam Ravi, Nadhiya, Asin Thottumkal, and Prakash Raj while Vivek and Subbaraju play supporting roles. This marks the Tamil debut of Asin and the first of several Tamil films she has acted in. The film's score and soundtrack are composed by Srikanth Deva. The film became a blockbuster and one of the most profitable movies of 2004.  It is a remake of the Telugu film Amma Nanna O Tamila Ammayi. It was Nadhiya's comeback movie, after a 10–15 years of hiatus from the industry

Plot 
For Kumaran (Jayam Ravi), life revolves only about his mother Mahalakshmi (Nadhiya), who got separated from her husband Easwar (Prakash Raj). Easwar goes on to pursue his passion in kickboxing and becomes a world-renowned trainer based in Malaysia. Mahalakshmi stays in Chennai and devotes her life to bringing up her son. Kumaran is also passionate about kickboxing and shares a special relationship with his mother. In between, he falls in love with Mythili (Asin), a Malayali girl, but his life is destroyed after his mother's death. On her deathbed, she tells him to meet Easwar, and Kumaran goes to Malaysia to meet him. Kumaran gets a job at his father's kickboxing academy but finds him with another wife, Shalini (Aishwarya), and a daughter Swapna. Kumaran feels betrayed and angry, and this causes plenty of friction between him and his father. Eeshwar trains a boxer named Anand (Subbaraju), who he is sure will win the championship. Easwar considers Anand his protege and, on many occasions, demonstrates his preference for him over Kumaran. However, Anand soon makes Swapna pregnant and dumps her. He then turns traitor to Easwar and joins another team when they offer him a better contract. The rest of the story is about how Easwar trains Kumaran against Anand and wins the kickboxing competition, while Kumaran helps his half-sister with her love. Kumaran wins the kickboxing championship. The movie ends with Kumaran seeing a final apparition of his mother looking at him proudly and waving goodbye.

Cast

Production 
After the success of Jayam (2003), Raja decided to remake the successful Telugu film Amma Nanna O Tamila Ammayi (2003) with his brother Ravi in the lead role. Asin, who appeared in the Telugu version, made her debut in Tamil cinema with this film. Nadhiya made her acting comeback with this film portraying Ravi's mother as Raja felt that he wanted to portray her as a modern mother as opposed to the usual portrayal of mothers, and she was the right choice for the role. Prakash Raj, Subbaraju, and Aishwarya reenact their roles from the Telugu film.

The team had also initially approached Dhruv, the son of actor Vikram, to star as a child artiste in the film, but he eventually did not feature.

The film was originally titled M. Kumaran S/O Bhagyalakshmi before reverting to the original title. The film was extensively shot in Malaysia.

Soundtrack 
The songs and background score was done by Srikanth Deva. The song "Ayyo Ayyo" is based on the Malaysian song "Hati Kama", composed by Pak Ngah. The song "Chennai Senthamizh" is based on "Chennai Chandrama" from the original film.

Home media 

The television satellite rights of the film were sold to Sun TV and VOD rights to Amazon Prime Video.

Reception

Critical reception 

The film received generally positive reviews with Indiaglitz.com saying "If you like films with sentiments, M Kumaran...is for you". Behindwoods.com stated that "Raja has done well for his second film" and "he has well defined the relationship between a mother and a son in this movie", while The Hindu wrote that "casting is a main draw", praising the inclusion of Nadhiya. Rediff.com also listed the film amongst the "best Tamil films of 2004", stating that the film was "a big success".

The film went on to become a commercial success and a major leap in Jayam Ravi's career.

Box-office 
The film collected share of 54 crore in 40 days in Chennai and 36 crore throughout Tamil Nadu selling $3 million tickets.

References

External links 
 

2000s Tamil-language films
2004 films
Films directed by Mohan Raja
Films scored by Srikanth Deva
Films shot in Malaysia
Indian boxing films
Indian sports drama films
Tamil remakes of Telugu films